Pljačkovica (Serbian Cyrillic: Пљачковица) is a mountain in southern Serbia, overlooking the city of Vranje. Its highest peak has an elevation of 1,231 meters above sea level.

Since the mountain is located on a strategic position over the city of Vranje, its peak hosts a TV tower and other telecommunication facilities. It was heavily bombed in the NATO bombing of FR Yugoslavia in 1999, and it is significantly contaminated with depleted uranium ammunition.

References

Mountains of Serbia